Rays is an album by Michael Nesmith, originally released in a limited edition of 100 in November 2005, then later released in an unlimited edition in April 2006.  Nesmith described the album as a cinematic journey of sound with elements of swing, jazz and instrumental funk that forms what he calls "New Century Modern".

Background
The album cover is a comic strip drawn by Drew Friedman and features Nesmith "driving" through five stages of his life, with a quest of looking to fill his "appetite":  1) His earlier career in The Monkees, where he is seen driving a Pontiac GTO and wearing his signature knit-cap; 2) His career as the frontman of the First National Band, driving a Jeep; 3) His Elephant Parts-era career, where he is seen driving a pink Cadillac (referring to his song, "Eldorado to the Moon"); 4) His later life as an author, entrepreneur and philanthropist, driving a Rolls-Royce and asking, "where am I?"; 5) And in the center of the cartoon, Nesmith is sitting peacefully under a tree on a hill, content with himself, stating, "suddenly, I’m not as hungry as I’d thought".

Track listing
All songs written by Michael Nesmith.
 "Zip Ribbon" – 3:05
 "Dynaflow" – 4:11
 "Friedrider	" – 3:08
 "Carhop" – 3:58
 "Boomcar" – 3:43
 "Best of It" – 2:29
 "Ed's October Café" – 3:18
 "Rays" – 3:37
 "Bells" – 4:28
 "Land o Pies" – 2:50
 "There It Is" – 3:40
 "Follows the Heart" – 3:12

Personnel
Michael Nesmith – vocals, synthesizer, guitar, keyboards
Gregg Bissonette - drums
Luis Conte – percussion
John Hobbs – keyboards, keyboard bass
Kurt Wagner – vocals
Production notes
Michael Nesmith – producer, engineer, sampling, technician
Richard Bryant – engineer, technician
Drew Friedman – text, cover art
Michael MacDonald – engineer, technician
Gary McGrath - assistant to Michael MacDonals at Private Island Trax

References

External links
 Rays Album Site

2005 albums
Michael Nesmith albums